Strategic lawsuits against public participation (also known as SLAPP suits or intimidation lawsuits), or strategic litigation against public participation, are lawsuits intended to censor, intimidate, and silence critics by burdening them with the cost of a legal defense until they abandon their criticism or opposition.

In a typical SLAPP, the plaintiff does not normally expect to win the lawsuit. The plaintiff's goals are accomplished if the defendant succumbs to fear, intimidation, mounting legal costs, or simple exhaustion and abandons the criticism. In some cases, repeated frivolous litigation against a defendant may raise the cost of directors and officers liability insurance for that party, interfering with an organization's ability to operate. A SLAPP may also intimidate others from participating in the debate. A SLAPP is often preceded by a legal threat. SLAPPs bring about freedom of speech concerns due to their chilling effect and are often difficult to filter out and penalize because the plaintiffs attempt to obfuscate their intent to censor, intimidate, or silence their critics.

To protect freedom of speech, some jurisdictions have passed anti-SLAPP laws (often called SLAPP-back laws). These laws often function by allowing a defendant to file a motion to strike and/or dismiss on the grounds that the case involves protected speech on a matter of public concern. The plaintiff then bears the burden of showing a probability that they will prevail. If the plaintiffs fail to meet their burden their claim is dismissed and the plaintiffs may be required to pay a penalty for bringing the case.

Anti-SLAPP laws sometimes come under criticism from those who believe that there should not be barriers to the right to petition for those who sincerely believe they have been wronged, regardless of ulterior motives. Hence, the difficulty in drafting SLAPP legislation, and in applying it, is to craft an approach which affords an early termination to invalid, abusive suits, without denying a legitimate day in court to valid good faith claims. Anti-SLAPP laws are generally considered to have a favorable effect, and many lawyers have fought to enact stronger laws protecting against SLAPPs.

Characteristics 
SLAPP is a form of strategic litigation or impact litigation. SLAPPs take various forms. The most common used to be a civil suit for defamation, which in the English common law tradition was a tort. The common law of libel dates to the early 17th century and, unlike most English law, is reverse onus, meaning that once someone alleges a statement is libelous, the burden is on the defendant to prove that it is not. In England and Wales, the Defamation Act 2013 removed most of the uses of defamation as a SLAPP by requiring the proof of special damage. Various abuses of this law including political libel (criticism of the political actions or views of others) have ceased to exist in most places, but persist in some jurisdictions (notably British Columbia and Ontario) where political views can be held as defamatory.

A common feature of SLAPPs is forum shopping, wherein plaintiffs find courts that are more favourable towards the claims to be brought than the court in which the defendant (or sometimes plaintiffs) live.

Other widely mentioned elements of a SLAPP are the actual effectiveness at silencing critics, the timing of the suit, inclusion of extra or spurious defendants (such as relatives or hosts of legitimate defendants), inclusion of plaintiffs with no real claim (such as corporations that are affiliated with legitimate plaintiffs), making claims that are very difficult to disprove or rely on no written record, ambiguous or deliberately mangled wording that lets plaintiffs make spurious allegations without fear of perjury, refusal to consider any settlement (or none other than cash), characterization of all offers to settle as insincere, extensive and unnecessary demands for discovery, attempts to identify anonymous or pseudonymous critics, appeals on minor points of law, and demands for broad rulings when appeal is accepted on such minor points of law. In some instances it is clear that plaintiffs are attempting to drain defendants of their financial resources by making the lawsuit as costly as possible, and in these cases the plaintiff's motive may not be legal victory, but merely to waste the defendant's time and money.

History 
The acronym was coined in the 1980s by University of Denver professors Penelope Canan and George W. Pring. The term was originally defined as "a lawsuit involving communications made to influence a governmental action or outcome, which resulted in a civil complaint or counterclaim filed against nongovernment individuals or organizations on a substantive issue of some public interest or social significance." The concept's originators later dropped the notion that government contact had to be about a public issue to be protected by the right to petition the government, as provided in the First Amendment. It has since been defined less broadly by some states, and more broadly in one state (California) where it includes suits about speech on any public issue.

The original conceptualization proffered by Canan and Pring emphasized the right to petition as protected in the United States under the US Constitution's specific protection in the First Amendment's fifth clause. It is still definitional: SLAPPs are civil lawsuits filed against those who have communicated to government officialdom (in its entire constitutional apparatus). The right to petition, granted by Edgar the Peaceful, King of England in the 10th century, antedates Magna Carta in terms of its significance in the development of democratic institutions. As currently conceived, the right claims that democracy cannot properly function in the presence of barriers between the governed and the governing.

New York Supreme Court Judge J. Nicholas Colabella said in reference to SLAPPs: "Short of a gun to the head, a greater threat to First Amendment expression can scarcely be imagined." In the United States a number of jurisdictions have made such suits illegal, however the conditions that a defendant must satisfy for a dismissal of the suit vary from state to state. In some states, such as California, defendants may be entitled to counter-sue SLAPP plaintiffs under some circumstances. This is commonly referred to as SLAPPback.

Jurisdictional variations

Australia 
In the Australian Capital Territory, the Protection of Public Participation Act 2008 (ACT) protects conduct intended to influence public opinion or promote or further action in relation to an issue of public interest. A party starting or maintaining a proceeding against a defendant for an improper purpose may be ordered to pay a financial penalty to the Territory.

Canada 
Some political libel and forum shopping incidents, both relatively uncommon in Canada, have been called SLAPPs, because such suits load defendants with costs of responding in unfamiliar jurisdictions or at times (typically elections) when they are extremely busy and short of funds. Both types of suit are unusual in Canada, so there is little academic concern or examination of whether political subject matter or remote forums are a clear indicator of SLAPP.[citation needed]

Canada's three most populous provinces (Quebec, British Columbia, and Ontario) have enacted anti-SLAPP legislation.

British Columbia 
One of the first cases in Canada to be explicitly ruled a SLAPP was Fraser v. Saanich (see [1999] B.C.J. No. 3100 (B.C. S.C.)) (QL), where the British Columbia Supreme Court struck out the claim of a hospital director against the District of Saanich, holding that it was a meritless action designed to silence or intimidate the residents who were opposed to the plaintiff's plan to redevelop the hospital facilities.

Following the decision in Fraser v. Saanich, the Protection of Public Participation Act (PPPA) went into effect in British Columbia in April 2001. The legislation was repealed in August 2001. There was extensive debate on its merits and the necessity of having hard criteria for judges and whether this tended to reduce or increase process abuse. The debate was largely formed by the first case to discuss and apply the PPPA, Home Equity Development v. Crow. The defendants' application to dismiss the action against them was dismissed. The defendants failed to meet the burden of proof required by the PPPA, that the plaintiffs had no reasonable prospect of success. While it was not the subject of the case, some felt that the plaintiffs did not bring their action for an improper purpose, and the suit did not inhibit the defendants in their public criticism of the particular project, and that the Act was, therefore, ineffective in this case.

Since the repeal, BC activists especially the BCCLA have argued repeatedly for a broad understanding of SLAPP and a broad interpretation of judicial powers especially in intervener applications in BC and other common law jurisdictions and when arguing for new legislation to prevent SLAPPs. The activist literature contains extensive research on particular cases and criteria. The West Coast Environmental Law organization agrees and generally considers BC to lag other jurisdictions.

In March 2019, the legislature voted unanimously to pass another anti-SLAPP bill, the Protection of Public Participation Act.

Nova Scotia 
A private member's bill introduced in 2001 by Graham Steele (NDP, Halifax Fairview) proposed a "Protection of Public Participation Act" to dismiss proceedings or claims brought or maintained for an improper purpose, awarding punitive or exemplary damages (effectively, a "SLAPP back") and protection from liability for communication or conduct which constitutes public participation. The bill did not progress beyond first reading.

Ontario 
In Ontario, the decision in Daishowa v. Friends of the Lubicon [1996] O.J. No. 3855 Ont. Ct. Gen. Div. (QL) was instructive on SLAPPs. A motion brought by the corporate plaintiff Daishowa to impose conditions on the defendant Friends of the Lubicon Indian Band that they would not represent Daishowa's action as a SLAPP was dismissed.

By 2010, the Ontario Attorney-General had issued a major report which identified SLAPP as a major problem but initially little to nothing was done.

In June 2013, the Attorney General introduced legislation to implement the recommendations of the report. The bill proposed a mechanism for an order to dismiss strategic lawsuits which attack free expression on matters of public interest, with full costs (but not punitive damages) and on a relatively short timeframe, if the underlying claims had no reasonable prospect of success.

The bill enjoyed support from a wide range of groups including municipalities, the Canadian Environmental Law Association, EcoJustice, Environmental Defence, Ontario Clean Air Alliance, Ontario Nature, Canadian Civil Liberties Association, Canadian Journalists for Free Expression, Citizens Environment Alliance of Southwestern Ontario, The Council of Canadians, CPAWS Wildlands League, Sierra Club Ontario, Registered Nurses' Association of Ontario and Greenpeace Canada.

The legislation was re-introduced following the 2014 Ontario election as Bill 52, and on 3 November 2015, Ontario enacted it as the Protection of Public Participation Act, 2015.

Quebec 
Québec's then Justice Minister, Jacques Dupuis, proposed an anti-SLAPP bill on 13 June 2008.
The bill was adopted by the National Assembly of Quebec on 3 June 2009. Quebec's amended Code of Civil Procedure was the first anti-SLAPP mechanism in force in Canada.

Prior to Ontario enacting its own Anti-SLAPP law the bill was invoked there (and then Supreme Court of Canada docket 33819). In the case of Les Éditions Écosociété Inc., Alain Deneault, Delphine Abadie and William Sacher vs. Banro Inc., in which the publisher Écosociété pleaded (supported by the BCCLA) that it should not face Ontario liability for a publication in Quebec, as the suit was a SLAPP and the Quebec law explicitly provided to dismiss these. The court denied the request, ruling it had jurisdiction. A separate 2011 decision in Quebec Superior Court had ruled that Barrick Gold had to pay $143,000 to the book's three authors and publisher, Les Éditions Écosociété Inc., to prepare their defence in a "seemingly abusive" strategic lawsuit against public participation. Despite the Québec ruling, a book Noir Canada documenting the relationship between Canadian mining corporations, armed conflict and political actors in Africa was never published as part of a settlement which, according to the authors, was only made for the sole purpose of resolving the three-and-a-half-year legal battle.

The Quebec law is substantially different in structure than that of California or other jurisdictions, however, as Quebec's Constitution generally subordinates itself to international law, and as such the International Covenant on Civil and Political Rights applies. That treaty only permits liability for arbitrary and unlawful speech. The ICCPR has also been cited, in the BC case Crookes v. Newton, as the standard for balancing free speech versus reputation rights. The Supreme Court of Canada in October 2011, ruling in that case, neither reiterated nor rescinded that standard.

European Union
On 25 November 2020, the European Parliament passed a resolution expressed "its continued deep concern about the state of media freedom within the EU in the context of the abuses and attacks still being perpetrated against journalists and media workers in some Member States because of their work" and called on the European Commission to "establish minimum standards against SLAPP practices across the EU". In 2021 the European Union was considering adopting an anti-SLAPP directive to protect the freedom of speech of European citizens.

United States 
Thirty-two states, the District of Columbia, and Guam have enacted statutory protections against SLAPPs.
These states are Arizona, Arkansas, California, Colorado, Connecticut, Delaware, Florida, Georgia, Hawaii, Illinois, Indiana, Kansas, Kentucky, Louisiana, Maine, Maryland, Massachusetts, Minnesota, Missouri, Nebraska, Nevada, New Mexico, New York, Oklahoma, Oregon, Pennsylvania, Rhode Island, Tennessee, Texas, Utah, Vermont, Virginia, and Washington. In Colorado and West Virginia, the courts have adopted protections against SLAPPs. These laws vary dramatically in scope and level of protection and the remaining states lack specific protections.

There is no federal anti-SLAPP law, but legislation for one has been previously introduced, such as the SPEAK FREE Act of 2015. The extent to which state laws apply in federal courts is unclear, and the circuits are split on the question. The First, Fifth and Ninth circuits have allowed litigants from Maine, Louisiana and California, respectively, to use their state's special motion in federal district courts in diversity actions. The D.C. Circuit has held the reverse for D.C. litigants.

It has been argued that the lack of uniform protection against SLAPPs has encouraged forum shopping; proponents of federal legislation have argued that the uncertainty about one's level of protection has likely magnified the chilling effect of SLAPPs.

In December 2009, Rep. Steve Cohen (D–Tennessee) introduced the Citizen Participation Act in the U.S. House. This marks the first time the Congress has considered federal anti-SLAPP legislation, though the Congress enacted the SPEECH Act on the closely related issue of libel tourism. Like many state anti-SLAPP laws, H.R. 4364 would allow the defendant of a SLAPP to have the suit quickly dismissed and to recover fees and costs.

California 

California has a unique variant of anti-SLAPP legislation. In 1992 California enacted Code of Civil Procedure § 425.16, a statute intended to frustrate SLAPPs by providing a quick and inexpensive defense. It provides for a special motion that a defendant can file at the outset of a lawsuit to strike a complaint when it arises from conduct that falls within the rights of petition or free speech. The statute expressly applies to any writing or speech made in connection with an issue under consideration or review by a legislative, executive, or judicial proceeding, or any other official proceeding authorized by law, but there is no requirement that the writing or speech be promulgated directly to the official body. It also applies to speech in a public forum about an issue of public interest and to any other petition or speech conduct about an issue of public interest.

Washington State 
In May 2015, the Washington Supreme Court struck down the state's 2010 anti-SLAPP statute. However, in 2021, a new anti-SLAPP law was enacted.

Balancing the right of access to the courts 
The SLAPP penalty stands as a barrier to access to the courts by providing an early penalty to claimants who seek judicial redress. In recent years, the courts in some states have recognized that enforcement of SLAPP legislation must recognize and balance the constitutional rights of both litigants. It has been said:
Since Magna Carta, the world has recognized the importance of justice in a free society. "To no one will we sell, to no one will we refuse or delay, right or justice." (Magna Carta, 1215.) This nation's founding fathers knew people would never consent to be governed and surrender their right to decide disputes by force, unless government offered a just forum for resolving those disputes.

The right to bring grievances to the courts, in good faith, is protected by state and federal constitutions in a variety of ways. In most states, the right to trial by jury in civil cases is recognized. The right to cross-examine witnesses is considered fundamental to the American judicial system. Moreover, the first amendment protects the right to petition the government for a redress of grievances. The "right to petition extends to all departments of the Government. The right of access to the courts is indeed but one aspect of the right of petition."
Because "the right to petition is 'among the most precious of the liberties safeguarded by the Bill of Rights', ... the right of access to the courts shares this 'preferred place' in [the United States'] hierarchy of constitutional freedoms and values."
This balancing question is resolved differently in different states, often with substantial difficulty.

In Palazzo v. Alves, the Supreme Court of Rhode Island stated:
By the nature of their subject matter, anti-SLAPP statutes require meticulous drafting. On the one hand, it is desirable to seek to shield citizens from improper intimidation when exercising their constitutional right to be heard with respect to issues of public concern. On the other hand, it is important that such statutes be limited in scope lest the constitutional right of access to the courts (whether by private figures, public figures, or public officials) be improperly thwarted. There is a genuine double-edged challenge to those who legislate in this area.

The most challenging balancing problem arises in application to SLAPP claims which do not sound (give rise to a claim) in tort. The common law and constitutional law have developed in the United States to create a high substantive burden to tort and tort-like claims which seek redress for public speech, especially public speech which addresses matters of public concern. The common law in many states requires the pleader to state accurately the content of libelous words. Constitutional law has provided substantive protection which bars recovery against a first amendment defense except upon clear and convincing evidence that there has been deliberate or reckless falsehood. For this reason, ferreting out the bad faith SLAPP claim at an early stage of litigation should be accomplished with relative ease. Extension of the SLAPP penalties to factually complex cases, where the substantive standard of proof at common law is lower presents special challenges.

A Minnesota Supreme Court case, Middle-Snake-Tamarac Rivers Watershed Dist. v. Stengrim, 784 N.W.2d 834 (Minn. 2010) establishes a two-step process to determine whether SLAPP procedure should be applied. The decision arises in the context of an effort to enforce a settlement agreement between a local government and an opponent of a flood control project. The landowner had accepted a significant monetary settlement in settlement of his opposition to land acquisition. The landowner agreed as part of the settlement to address no further challenges to the project. When the local government sued the landowner for breach of settlement, the landowner contended that enforcement of the settlement was a strategic lawsuit against public participation. The Supreme Court rejected that claim and affirmed the District Court's denial of SLAPP relief, holding "The District Court properly denied a motion to dismiss where the underlying claim involved an alleged breach of a settlement agreement that potentially limited the moving party's rights to public participation." The Supreme Court explained:

Preexisting legal relationships, such as those based on a settlement agreement where a party waives certain rights, may legitimately limit a party's public participation. It would be illogical to read sections 554.01-.05 as providing presumptive immunity to actions that a moving party may have contractually agreed to forgo or limit.

Under the Minnesota approach, as a preliminary matter, the moving party must meet the burden of showing that the circumstances which bring the case within the purview of SLAPP protection exists. Until that has been accomplished, no clear and convincing burden has been shifted to the responding party.

Notable SLAPPs

Australia 
 "Gunns 20": In the 2005 Gunns Limited v Marr & Ors case, Gunns filed a writ in the Supreme Court of Victoria against 20 individuals and organisations, including Senator Bob Brown, for over A$7.8 million. The defendants have become collectively known as the "Gunns 20". Gunns claimed that the defendants sullied its reputation and caused it to lose jobs and profits. The defendants claimed that they are protecting the environment. Opponents and critics of the case have suggested that the writ was filed with the intent to discourage public criticism of the company. Gunns has maintained the position that they were merely trying to prevent parties enjoined to the writ from undertaking unlawful activities that disrupt their business. The statement of claim alleged incidents of assault against forestry workers and vandalism. At a hearing before the Supreme Court of Victoria, an amended statement of claim lodged by the company and served on defendants on 1 July 2005, was dismissed. However, the judge in the case granted the company leave to lodge a third version of their statement of claim with the court no later than 15 August 2005. The application continued before the court, before being brought to a close on 20 October 2006. In his ruling, Justice Bernard Bongiorno made an award of costs in favour of the respondents only as far as it covered those costs incurred with striking out the third version of the statement of claim, and costs incurred associated with their application for costs. In November 2006, Gunns dropped the case against Helen Gee, Peter Pullinger and Doctors for Forests. In December 2006, it abandoned the claim against Greens MPs Bob Brown and Peg Putt. The other matters were all settled in favour of Gunns following the payment of more than $150,000 in damages or, in some cases, undertakings to the court not to protest at certain locations.

Belgium
Belgian law recognizes the concept of "tergend geding" (bullying litigation), any litigation of which the underlying aim is to cause discomfort to the opposing party, and hence increase the possibility of its redrawal from the law suit. Qualification of litigation as such by a judge can lead to its dismissal.

Brazil 
 ThyssenKrupp Atlantic Steel Company (TKCSA), one of the largest private enterprises in Latin America, sued Brazilian researchers from public universities as UERJ (Rio de Janeiro State University) and Fiocruz (Oswaldo Cruz Foundation) for moral damages. First, TKCSA sued research pulmonologist Hermano Albuquerque de Castro from Sergio Arouca National School of Public Health (ENSP – Fiocruz). Then TKCSA sued Alexandre Pessoa Dias, research professor of the Joaquim Venâncio Polytechnic School of Health (EPSJV – Fiocruz), and Monica Cristina Lima, a biologist from Pedro Ernesto University Hospital and board member of the Public University Workers Union of Rio de Janeiro State (Sintuperj). The last two lawsuits occurred after the disclosure of the technical report "Evaluation of social, environmental and health impacts caused by the setup and operation of TKCSA in Santa Cruz".

Canada 
 Daishowa Inc. v. Friends of the Lubicon: From 1995 to 1998 a series of judgements (OJ 1536 1995, OJ 1429 1998 (ONGD)) established that defendants, who had accused a global company of engaging in "genocide", were entitled to recover court costs due to the public interest in the criticism, even if it was rhetorically unjustifiable. This was the first case to establish clearly the SLAPP criteria.
 Fraser v. Saanich (District) 1995, [BCJ 3100 BCSC] was held explicitly to be a SLAPP, the first known case to be so described. Justice Singh found plaintiff's conduct to be "reprehensible and deserving of censure", ordering he pay "special costs" (page 48, Strategic Lawsuits Against Public Participation: The British Columbia Experience, RECEIL 19(1) 2010 ) to compensate.
 Canadian Prime Minister Stephen Harper filed a suit against the Liberal Party of Canada, the Official Opposition, after the latter paid for trucks to drive through the streets playing a journalist's tape of Harper admitting he knew of "financial considerations" offered to dying MP Chuck Cadman before a critical House of Commons of Canada vote in 2005. This, the Liberals and most commentators and authorities agreed, would be a serious crime if proven. Harper alleged the tape had been altered but a court found no evidence of this. The suit was dropped by Michael Ignatieff after he replaced Stephane Dion as Leader of the Opposition, and so was not heard in court, but was transparently a (successful) effort to get the trucks off the streets.
 Crookes v. Openpolitics.ca, filed May 2006 [S063287, Supreme Court of BC], and a series of related suits leading to a unanimous October 2011 ruling by the Supreme Court of Canada in Crookes v. Newton, upheld the rights of online debaters to link freely to third parties without fear of liability for contents at the other end of the link. A number of related rulings had previously established that transient comments on the Internet could not be, in themselves, simply printed and used to prove that "publication" had occurred for purposes of libel and defamation law in Canada. Other elements of the ruling clarified how responsible journalism (and therefore the right to protect anonymous sources), qualified privilege and innocent dissemination defenses applied to persons accused of online defamation.
 In May 2010, Youthdale Treatment Centres of Toronto, Ontario filed a defamation suit against various former patients, parents of former patients, and other persons, claiming C$5 million in damages. The lawsuit, filed on 5 May 2010, on behalf of Youthdale by Harvin Pitch and Jennifer Lake of Teplitsky, Colson LLP, claimed that these persons were involved in a conspiracy to, among other things, have Youthdale's licence to operate revoked. Youthdale also claimed their reputation was damaged as a result of various actions by the named defendants, which Youthdale alleged included the creation of websites and blogs containing complaints against Youthdale, including alleged accusations of unlawful administration of psychotropic medications. A notable left-turn for Youthdale occurred in July 2010, when Youthdale became the subject of a Toronto Star investigation, in which it was found that Youthdale had been admitting children to its Secure Treatment Unit that did not have mental disorders. The case has since been dismissed.
 In 2011, in Robin Scory v. Glen Valley Watersheds Society, a BC court ruled that "an order for special costs acts as a deterrent to litigants whose purpose is to interfere with the democratic process", and that "Public participation and dissent is an important part of our democratic system." However, such awards remained rare.
 Morris vs Johnson et al. 22 October 2012, ONSC 5824 (CanLII): During the final weeks of the 2010 municipal election in Aurora, Ontario, a group of town councilors and the incumbent Mayor Phyllis Morris agreed to use town funds to launch what was later referenced as a private lawsuit fronted by the Mayor, seeking $6M, against both named and anonymous residents who were critical of the local government. After the mayor and a number of councilors lost the election the new town council cut public funding for the private lawsuit and they issued a formal apology to the defendants. Almost one year after the town cut funding and after Morris lost a Norwich motion, Morris discontinued her case. The discontinuance cost decision delivered by Master Hawkins reads, per para. 32 (Ontario Superior court of Justice court file no.10-CV-412021): "Because I regard this action as SLAPP litigation designed to stifle debate about Mayor Morris' fitness for office, commenced during her re-election campaign, I award Johnson and Hogg special enhanced costs as was done in Scory v. Krannitz 2011 BCSC 1344 per Bruce J. at para. 31 (B.C.S.C)." Morris subsequently sued the town for $250,000 in the spring of 2013 to recover her legal costs for the period after the town cut funding of her case. Almost one and a half years after the final ruling in the Morris defamation case (i.e. the second Master Hawkins cost ruling delivered in January 2013) and approximately one year after suing the town, Morris amended her statement of claim to note that her legal costs were actually $27,821.46 and not the $250,000 as noted in the initial statement of claim. Morris then attempted to move the case to small claims court after the town had already spent over $150,000 in preparing its defense. As of the summer of 2015 the case is ongoing.
 In 2012, Sino-Forest sued Muddy Waters Research for $4 billion for defamation in the Ontario Superior Court of Justice. Muddy Waters had accused Sino-Forest of fraudulently inflating its assets and earnings, and had claimed the company's shares were essentially worthless. However, on 10 January 2012, Sino-Forest announced that its historic financial statements and related audit reports should not be relied upon. Sino-forest also filed for bankruptcy protection. In response to the lawsuit, Muddy Waters stated that Sino's bankruptcy protection filing vindicated its accusations since the company would not require bankruptcy protection if it was really generating close to $2 billion in cash flow. Sino-Forest was represented by Bennett Jones LLP.
 Businesspeople Garth Drabinsky and Conrad Black filed numerous suits against critics of their business activities. These received much publicity but were usually settled quickly.
 In September 2014, Brampton, Ontario mayor Susan Fennell used threats of legal action against fellow councillors, the Toronto Star, the city's integrity commissioner, and auditor Deloitte to delay a city council meeting which was to discuss a major spending scandal. As the parties involved needed an opportunity to seek legal advice, regardless of the merit (or spuriousness) of the claims, this tactic served to defer a key debate which otherwise would have, and should have, taken place before the city's 27 October municipal election.

Estonia 

In 2016, the real-estate investment company Pro Kapital Ltd sued urbanist Teele Pehk who expressed her opinion about the company's development plans in the Kalasadam area of Tallinn, Estonia. The accusations were based on an interview given for the article "The battle for the Estonian coastline", published by the monthly newspaper The Baltic Times. Initially, instead of clarifying the questionable quotes in the article with the Baltic Times editors, Pro Kapital sent a legal demand to Pehk demanding that she publish a pre-written explanation and pay €500 to cover their legal advice expenses. Pehk provided proof to the lawyer that she had not lied to the journalist of The Baltic Times, and the newspaper published a clarification online that Pehk's words were misinterpreted. Few months later Pro Kapital sued Pehk for damaging their reputation by spreading lies about the detailed plan of the Kalasadam area. Teele Pehk had been involved with the detailed plan of Kalasadam since 2011, as a member of the neighbourhood association Telliskivi selts and caretaker of the Kalarand beach, situated on the edge of the Kalasadam area.

Half a year into the court case, Pro Kapital began negotiations and settled with a compromise before the court hearing. Pro Kapital paid for Pehk's legal costs and both parties agreed not to disparage each other in the future. Teele Pehk is still active in Tallinn urban development and continues to spread the word about SLAPP suits.

This case took place at the end of the 12-year process of planning the Kalasadam area, which over the years had witnessed exceptionally high public interest regarding the planned residential development and most importantly, the public use of the seaside and the beach. The planning system in Estonia allows anyone to express their opinion, present suggestions or objections to any detailed plan. Many Estonian civic organisations were raising concerned voices about the case and the Chancellor for Justice of Estonia condemned that practice many times in public appearances.

France 
 In 2010 and 2011, a French blogger was summoned twice by the communication company Cometik (NOVA-SEO) over exposing their quick-selling method (a.k.a. one shot method) and suggesting a financial compensation for his first trial. The company's case was dismissed twice, but appealed both times. On 31 March 2011, the company won:
 the censorship of any reference (of its name) on Mathias Poujol-Rost's weblog,
 €2,000 as damages,
 the obligation to publish the judicial decision for 3 months,
 €2,000 as procedural allowance,
 all legal fees for both first and appeal instances.

Germany 
In September 2017, a naturopath in Arizona named Colleen Huber filed a defamation lawsuit, preceded by two cease and desist letters, against Britt Marie Hermes, a naturopathy whistleblower. The lawsuit was filed for Hermes' blog post criticizing Huber for using naturopathic remedies to treat cancer and speculating that Hermes' name was being used without her permission in several registered domain names owned by Huber. The lawsuit was filed in Kiel, Germany where Hermes was residing to pursue her PhD in evolutionary genomics. Jann Bellamy of Science-Based Medicine speculates that this is "due to good old forum shopping for a more plaintiff-friendly jurisdiction" as there are no protections against SLAPP lawsuits in Germany. Britt Hermes is a notable scientific skeptic and the organization Australian Skeptics set up a fund to help with legal costs on the case. In an interview at CSICon 2019, Britt Hermes told Susan Gerbic that she had won her case on 24 May 2019. According to Britt Hermes, "the court ruled that my post is protected speech under Article 5 (1) of the German constitution".

Greece 

In 2022, in the wake of revelations that Greece's National Intelligence Service (Greece) was spying on the leader of PASOK, the third largest party, Nikos Androulakis, the executive director of NIS, Grigoris Kontoleon, and the Secretary General to prime minister Kyriakos Mitsotakis, Grigoris Dimitriadis (also a close relative of Kyriakos Mitsotakis) resigned from office. Grigoris Dimitriadis filed lawsuits against two journalists who had helped uncover the scandal, Thodoris Chondrogiannos and Nikolas Leontopoulos, demanding 150,000 euros as damages for false publications and the removal of those publications, but also against Thanassis Koukakis, a journalist who during 2021 was spied upon because of his investigations on Greek businessmen.

India 
In 2020, Karan Bajaj, the founder of  WhiteHat Jr., now owned by Byju's, filed a 2.6 million dollar lawsuit against Pradeep Poonia, an engineer who publicly accused the company of having a toxic work environment and unethical business practices. The Delhi High Court issued an interim order requiring Poonia to remove certain tweets from his account. In 2021, Bajaj rescinded the lawsuit.

Israel 
During 2016, Amir Bramly, who at the time was being investigated and subsequently indicted for an alleged Ponzi scheme, sued for libel Tomer Ganon, a Calcalist reporter, privately for ₪1 million in damages, due to a news item linking him to Bar Refaeli. In addition Bramly sued Channel-2 News and its reporters and managers for ₪5 million in damages due to an alleged libel in an in-depth TV news item and interview with the court appointed liquidator of his companies, and has threatened to sue additional bodies. The sued individuals and bodies have claimed that these are SLAPP actions.

Japan 
In 2006, Oricon Inc., Japan's music chart provider, sued freelance journalist Hiro Ugaya due to his suggesting in an article for business and culture magazine  that the company was fiddling its statistics to benefit certain management companies and labels, specifically Johnny and Associates. The company sought ¥50 million and apology from him. He found allies in the magazine's editor-in-chief Tadashi Ibi, lawyer Kentaro Shirosaki, and Reporters Sans Frontières (RSF).

He was found guilty in 2008 by the Tokyo District Court and ordered to pay one million yen, but he appealed and won. Oricon did not appeal later. His 33-month struggle against Oricon and his research on SLAPPs through his self-expense trip in the United States was featured on the TBS program JNN Reportage, titled as "Legal Intimidation Against Free Speech: What is SLAPP?"

RSF expressed its support to the journalist and was relieved on the abandonment of the suit.

Norway 
On 17 May 2018, a non-profit project rettspraksis.no challenged a perceived monopoly on the publication of pre-2009 Supreme Court of Norway decisions by publishing a large back catalogue of historical decisions. To prevent publication, the government-established Lovdata foundation demanded an immediate injunction against two project volunteers, Håkon Wium Lie and Fredrik Ljone, that the website be shut down. The foundation claimed that rettspraksis.no had "developed or used software to systematically download rulings from Lovdatas online services" in order to publish the rulings in violation of Lovdata's rights according to the Norwegian Copyright Act section 43, the Database Rights Section. The District Court granted the injunction without a hearing based on finding that the volunteer actions was in violation of section 43, and that the publication on rettspraksis.no would enable other commercial actors to exploit the material in violation of Lovdata's rights even if the project itself did not. A postjudgement hearing on 30 and 31 August 2018 resulted in a reduction in the injunction's effects, most significantly that the Database Rights Section did not extend to rulings published before 2005. Appeals from Ljone and Wium Lie to the Appeals Court and the Supreme Court were denied.

Serbia 

In the late 1990s, many SLAPP cases against independent and pro-opposition media ensued after adoption of the infamous media law, proposed by then minister of information, Aleksandar Vučić. The main characteristic of these cases were quick trials and extremely high fines, most of which were unaffordable for journalists and their media houses.
While SLAPP cases became, more or less, rare after the Overthrow of Slobodan Milošević, they gradually reappeared in the late 2010s, and especially in the early 2020s, during SNS-led cabinets. Notably, Aleksandar Vučić is current president of Serbia, the most influential figure of the regime, and he is often accused of suppression of media freedoms.

United Kingdom
A 2021 libel action brought against the publisher HarperCollins and the author and journalist Catherine Belton over the latter's book Putin's People was described by former Conservative cabinet minister David Davis as a SLAPP. Despite winning the legal case brought by several Russian oligarchs, including Roman Abramovich, Belton was left facing legal costs of £1.5 million. UK Government justice minister James Cartlidge said, "the Ministry of Justice is monitoring SLAPP threats against journalists and announced that the UK will be a member of the Council of Europe’s inaugural working group on SLAPPs with an anti-SLAPP draft recommendation for member states due in December 2023. I will be giving SLAPPs in UK courts urgent consideration. I want to make it clear that the Government are committed to a robust defence of transparency and freedom of speech. We will not tolerate anything that risks tarnishing the integrity of our judicial and legal profession".

Ministers later said that they would reform the legal system to prevent "intimidation lawsuits"; amendments to this effect were proposed for an anti-corruption economic crime bill before Parliament in March 2022.

In January 2023 The Times reported that "Chancellor Nadhim Zahawi ‘told solicitors to send Slapp letter’" to Dan Neidle over claims about Zahawi's tax affairs.

United States 
 From 1981 to 1986, Pacific Legal Foundation (PLF) and San Luis Obispo County, California, filed a suit attempting to obtain the mailing list of the Abalone Alliance to get the group to pay for the police costs of the largest anti-nuclear civil-disobedience act in U.S. history at the Diablo Canyon Power Plant. The September 1981 demonstration involved tens of thousands of people. The County was dismissed from the case by the trial judge, and lost on appeal for recovery of police costs (including in part because such costs are intended to be covered by taxes). In 1985, the Supreme Court of California declined to block a lower court ruling that allowed PLF to sue "leaders of the demonstration [for] costs associated with the protest", which defendants said was an attempt to chill dissent. Pacific Legal Foundation lost at every court level and withdrew the suit the day before it was due to be heard by the U.S. Supreme Court. 
 Kim Shewalter and other neighborhood activists, as defendants, won a 1998 anti-SLAPP motion against apartment building owners. The owners had filed a SLAPP because of the defendants' protest activities.
 Karen Winner, the author of Divorced From Justice, is recognized as "[the] catalyst for the changes that we adopted", said Leo Milonas, a retired justice with the Appellate Division of the New York state courts who chaired a special commission that recommended the changes adopted by Chief Judge Judith Kaye. (The NY state court report's committee cited a previous New York City Commissioner of Consumer Protection report as a "major" reason for its study.  Karen Winner was the author of the earlier study.) But in 1999, Winner, along with a psychologist/whistleblower, and several citizens were SLAPPed for criticizing the guardian ad litem system and a former judge in South Carolina. Winner's report, "Findings on Judicial Practices & Court-appointed Personnel in the Family Courts in Dorchester, Charleston & Berkeley Counties, South Carolina" and citizen demonstrations led to the first laws in South Carolina to establish minimum standards and licensing requirements for guardians ad litem, who represent the interests of children in court cases. The retaliatory SLAPPs have been dragging on for nearly 10 years, with judgments totaling more than $11 million against the co-defendants collectively. Reflecting the retaliatory nature of these suits, at least one of the co-defendants is still waiting to find out from the judges which particular statements, if any, he made were false.
 Barbra Streisand, as plaintiff, lost a 2003 SLAPP motion after she sued an aerial photographer involved in the California Coastal Records Project. Streisand v. Adelman, (California Superior Court Case SC077257) See Streisand effect.
 Barry King and another Internet poster, as defendants, won an anti-SLAPP motion against corporate plaintiffs based on critical posts on an Internet financial message board.
 Kathi Mills won an anti-SLAPP motion against the Atlanta Humane Society, Atlanta Humane Society v. Mills, in Gwinnett County (Georgia) Superior Court; case 01-A-13269-1. She had been sued based on comments she made to an internet forum after a news program had aired critical of the AHS. In part, the judge ruled that private citizens do not need to investigate news coverage before they make their own comments on it, and that governmental entities may not sue for defamation.
 In 2004, RadioShack Corporation sued Bradley D. Jones, the webmaster of RadioShackSucks.com and a former RadioShack dealer for 17 years, in an attempt to suppress online discussion of a class action lawsuit in which more than 3,300 current or former RadioShack managers were alleging the company required them to work long hours without overtime pay.
 Nationally syndicated talk radio host Tom Martino prevailed in an anti-SLAPP motion in 2009 after he was sued for libel by a watercraft retailer. The case received national attention for its suggestion that no one reasonably expects objective facts from a typical talk show host, who is often a comedian telling jokes.
 In March 2009, MagicJack (a company that promotes a USB VoIP device) filed a defamation suit against Boing Boing for exposing their unfair and deceptive business tactics regarding their EULA, visitor counter, and 30-day trial period. This was dismissed as a SLAPP by a California judge in late 2009. In the resulting ruling, MagicJack was made responsible for most of Boing Boing's legal costs.
 In the 2009 case Comins vs. VanVoorhis, a Florida man named Christopher Comins filed a defamation suit against a University of Florida graduate student after the student blogged about a video of Comins repeatedly shooting someone's pet dogs. This was cited as an example of a SLAPP by the radio show On the Media.
 In November 2010, filmmaker Fredrik Gertten, as defendant, won an anti-SLAPP motion after he was sued for defamation by Dole Fruit Company. The case concerned Gertten's documentary film about farm workers. The lengthy lawsuit was documented in Gertten's film Big Boys Gone Bananas!*.
 In an effort to prevent four women from filing any Public Records Requests without first getting permission from a judge, or from filing future lawsuits, the Congress Elementary School District filed the lawsuit Congress Elementary School District v. Warren, et. al. on 28 January 2010. The Goldwater Institute, a think tank based in Phoenix, Arizona, represented the four defendants. The school district said that it has been harassed so often by Warren that it was not able to functionally educate its students. Toni Wayas, the school district's superintendent, claimed "that it had, time and time again, complied with the requests". The Goldwater Institute argued that the school district had been in violation of state laws mandating government transparency in the past. Investigations in 2002 and 2007 by the state Ombudsman and Attorney General uncovered violations of the state's open meeting law by the Attorney General's Office. According to Carrie Ann Sitren of the Goldwater Institute, this was "a clear attempt to silence people in the community who have been critical of the board's actions, and have made good-faith attempts to ensure the district is spending taxpayer money wisely". None of the records requested were private or confidential, and thus, should have been readily available to be released to the public, according to the assistant state Ombudsman.
 In December 2010, prominent foreclosure defense attorney Matthew Weidner was sued by Nationwide Title, a foreclosure processing firm.
 In January 2011 Sony Computer Entertainment America sued George Hotz and other individuals for jailbreaking the PlayStation 3 and publishing encryption and signing keys for various layers of the system's architecture. The defendants and the Electronic Frontier Foundation consider the case an egregious abuse of the Digital Millennium Copyright Act. Hotz settled with Sony before trial.
 In December 2015, James McGibney was ordered to pay a $1 million anti-SLAPP court sanction and $300,000 in attorney's fees to Neal Rauhauser for filing a series of baseless lawsuits against him. The ruling was temporarily reversed when the presiding judge granted McGibney's request for a new trial in February 2016, but reinstated in favor of Rauhasuer on 14 April 2016, with the SLAPP sanction against McGibney reduced from $1 million to $150,000. The judge ruled that McGibney had filed the suits to willfully and maliciously injure Rauhauser and to deter him from exercising his constitutional right to criticize McGibney.
 "Scientology versus the Internet" refers to a number of disputes relating to the Church of Scientology's efforts to suppress material critical of Scientology on the Internet through the use of lawsuits and legal threats.
 The Agora Six – The Cynwyd Group, LLC v. Stefany (2009) 
 Saltsman v. Goddard (the Steubenville High School rape case): In an effort to stop blogger Alexandria Goddard's website from allowing allegedly defamatory posts about their son, two parents of a teenaged boy from Steubenville, Ohio sued Goddard and a dozen anonymous posters in October 2012. The lawsuit asked for an injunction against the blogger, a public apology, acknowledgement that he was not involved in the rape, and $25,000 in damages.
 In August 2015, the State Fair of Texas was sanctioned more than $75,000 for filing a SLAPP suit against a lawyer who had requested financial documents from the State Fair.
 On 27 August 2012, Robert E. Murray and Murray Energy filed a lawsuit against environment reporter Ken Ward Jr. and the Charleston Gazette-Mail of Charleston, West Virginia. The lawsuit alleged Ken Ward Jr. posted libelous statements on his blog. Murray claims the blog post entitled "Mitt Romney, Murray Energy and Coal Criminals" has damaged his business, reputation, and has jeopardized the jobs Murray Energy provides in Belmont County, Ohio. In June 2017, Murray Energy issued a cease and desist letter to the HBO television show Last Week Tonight with John Oliver following the show's attempt to obtain comment about the coal industry. The show went ahead with the episode (18 June), in which host John Oliver discussed the Crandall Canyon Mine collapse in Utah in 2007, and expressed the opinion that Murray did not do enough to protect his miners' safety. Three days later, Murray and his companies brought suit against Oliver, the show's writers, HBO, and Time Warner. The lawsuit alleged that, in the Last Week Tonight show, Oliver "incited viewers to do harm to Mr. Murray and his companies". The ACLU filed an amicus brief in support of HBO in the case; the brief has been described as "hilarious" and the "snarkiest legal brief ever". The brief also included a comparison of Murray with the fictional character Dr. Evil that was used in the Oliver show, with the explanation that "it should be remembered that truth is an absolute defense to a claim of defamation". On 11 August 2017, a federal district court judge ruled that Murray Energy suits against The New York Times and HBO could each proceed in a lower state court. The suit against HBO was dismissed with prejudice on 21 February 2018. In November 2019, John Oliver discussed the implications of the lawsuit (and of SLAPP suits in general) on his show after Murray dropped the suit.
 In March 2019, U.S. Rep. Devin Nunes (R-California) filed a defamation lawsuit against Twitter, Elizabeth "Liz" Mair, Mair Strategies LLC, and the people behind the parody Twitter accounts "Devin Nunes' Cow" (@DevinCow) and "Devin Nunes' Mom" (@DevinNunesMom), seeking $250 million in damages. The lawsuit has been described by legal experts as a SLAPP. Notably, the suit was filed in Virginia, a state known to have weak anti-SLAPP laws, rather than in California, where Nunes resides and where Twitter is headquartered, but which also has strong anti-SLAPP laws. In April 2019, Nunes filed a defamation lawsuit against The Fresno Bee, his hometown newspaper, and its owner, McClatchy, after it published a story detailing how investors in his winery partied on a yacht with cocaine and prostitutes.  Like the prior lawsuit, it was filed in Virginia. Nunes has since filed additional lawsuits claiming defamation against CNN, Ryan Lizza, Hearst Magazines, Campaign for Accountability, Fusion GPS, and others. In February 2020 (following the 2019 elections in which Democrats took control of both chambers for the first time since 1994), the Virginia General Assembly passed bills intended to discourage future SLAPPs in the state by strengthening defendant protections.

See also 

 Barratry (common law)
 Cease and desist
 Chilling effect
 Franchise fraud
 Lawfare
 Legal abuse
 Legal threat
 Media transparency
 Public participation
 Reputation management
 Spamigation
 Vexatious litigation
 Frivolous litigation

Case studies 
 McDonald's Restaurants v Morris & Steel
 Scientology and the legal system
 Varian v. Delfino
 Horizon Group v. Bonnen
 Santa Barbara News-Press controversy#Susan Paterno
 Steven Donziger

References

Further reading

External links 
 slapp Anti-SLAPP Advisory Panel 
 Survival Guide for SLAPP Victims
 Activist SLAPPs Back in Countersuit against Sienna Developer

Abuse of the legal system
Ethically disputed judicial practices
Lawsuits
Legal terminology
Right to petition
Strategic lawsuits against public participation
Tort law
1980s neologisms